Koetong is a locality in north-east Victoria, Australia.

Koetong was surveyed in 1885 but not proclaimed until 1952. Tin and gold mining has been sporadically carried out in the area since 1873.

The local state school first opened in 1890 and after several temporary closures, closed permanently in 2003. The town is an access point to nearby Mount Lawson State Park.

Climate

Koetong features warm, stormy summers and cold, very wet winters with frequent snowfalls at higher elevations.

Rainfall peaks distinctly in winter.

References

See also
Koetong railway station

Towns in Victoria (Australia)
Shire of Towong